Hetton Academy (formerly Hetton School) is a coeducational secondary school located in Hetton-le-Hole in the City of Sunderland, Tyne and Wear, England.

Established in 1912, the school admits pupils mainly from Easington Lane Primary School, Eppleton Academy, Hetton Primary School and Hetton Lyons Primary School.

A new school building was constructed on the same site and was completed in September 2016. The new building was officially opened by the local Member of Parliament, Bridget Phillipson, on 13 January 2017.

Previously a community school administered by Sunderland City Council, in September 2022 Hetton School converted to academy status and was renamed Hetton Academy. The school is now sponsored by the Northern Education Trust.

Hetton Academy offers GCSEs and Cambridge Nationals as programmes of study for pupils. Most graduating students go on to attend Headways Sixth Form, a sixth form provision offered by a consortium of secondary schools (including Hetton Academy) and Sunderland College.

Notable people
Jordan Cook, footballer
Steph Houghton, footballer

References

External links
Hetton Academy official website

Secondary schools in the City of Sunderland
Educational institutions established in 1912
1912 establishments in England
Academies in the City of Sunderland